Asclepiodorus of Athens was a painter, contemporary of Apelles, who considered him to excel himself in the symmetry and correctness of his drawing. Plutarch  ranks him with Euphranor and Nicias.

References
 

Ancient Athenians
Ancient Greek painters
4th-century BC Greek people
Year of birth unknown
Year of death unknown